Odo of Tournai, also known as Odoardus or Odo of Orléans (1060–1113), was a Benedictine monk, scholar and bishop of Cambrai (from 1105/6).

Odo was born at Orléans. In 1087 he was invited by the canons of Tournai to teach in that city, and there soon won a great reputation. He became a Benedictine monk (1095) in St. Martin's Abbey, Tournai, of which he became abbot later. In 1105 he was chosen Bishop of Cambrai, and was consecrated during a synod at Reims. For some time after he was unable to obtain possession of his see owing to his refusal to receive investiture at the hands of Emperor Henry IV, but the latter's son Henry restored the See of Cambrai to Odo in 1106.

He laboured diligently for his diocese, but in 1110 he was exiled on the ground that he had never received the cross and ring from the emperor. Odo retired to Anchin Abbey, near Pecquencourt, where he died without regaining possession of his diocese. Many of his works are lost; those extant are in Migne.

His treatise De peccato originali in three books, composed between 1095 and 1105, discuss the problem of universals, and of genera and species from a realist viewpoint.

Works and translations
 De peccato originali libri tres Migne, Patrologia Latina, vol. CLX, col. 1071–1102.
 On Original Sin and A Disputation with the Jew, Leo, Concerning the Advent of Christ, the Son of God. Two Theological Treatises, Translated and edited by Irven M. Resnick, Philadelphia, University of Pennsylvania Press, 1994.

Bibliography
 I. M. Resnick (1997), Odo of Tournai, the Phoenix, and the Problem of Universals, Journal of the History of Philosophy, Volume 35, Number 3, pp. 355–374.
 Christophe Erismann, L’homme commun. La genèse du réalisme ontologique durant le haut Moyen Âge, Vrin 2011. (Chapter VI: Odon de Cambrai, pp. 331–362).

See also 
 Raimbert of Lille

References
 

French Benedictines
Bishops of Cambrai
12th-century French Roman Catholic bishops
Investiture Controversy
1060 births
1113 deaths
Clergy from Orléans